Mountain Dale or Mountaindale is the name of several places in the USA:
Mountain Dale, Missouri
Mountain Dale, New York
Mountaindale, Oregon
Mountaindale, Pennsylvania